Smallanthus is a genus of flowering plants in the tribe Millerieae within the family Asteraceae.

Taxonomy
The following species are currently recognized:

Smallanthus apus – Mexico
Smallanthus cocuyensis – Colombia
Smallanthus connatus – Brazil, Bolivia, Paraguay, Uruguay, Argentina, Chile
Smallanthus fruticosus – Ecuador, Peru
Smallanthus glabratus – Bolivia, Peru
Smallanthus jelksii – Peru
Smallanthus latisquamus – Mexico, Central America
Smallanthus lundellii – Guatemala
Smallanthus macroscyphus – Argentina, Bolivia, Brazil, Paraguay
Smallanthus maculatus – Central America, Chiapas, Oaxaca, Tabasco, Veracruz
Smallanthus macvaughii – Jalisco
Smallanthus meridensis – Venezuela
Smallanthus microcephalus – Ecuador, Peru
Smallanthus oaxacanus – Mexico, Guatemala, Honduras
Smallanthus obscurus – Chiapas 
Smallanthus parviceps – Bolivia
Smallanthus putlanus – Oaxaca
Smallanthus pyramidalis – Colombia, Ecuador, Venezuela
Smallanthus quichensis –  Guatemala, Costa Rica
Smallanthus riograndensis – Rio Grande do Sul
Smallanthus riparius – Colombia, Ecuador, Peru, Venezuela, Guatemala, Chiapas
Smallanthus siegesbeckia – Bolivia, Peru, Paraguay
Smallanthus sonchifolius (yacón) – Colombia, Ecuador, Peru, Bolivia
Smallanthus uvedalia – eastern and south-central United States from Texas to Florida to New York

References

 
Asteraceae genera
Taxa named by Kenneth Kent Mackenzie